The Guningtou Battle Museum is located in the Kuningtou area of the Kinmen National Park, Jinning Township, Kinmen County, Taiwan.

History
The museum was built in 1984 by local military and civilian population to commemorate the Battle of Guningtou (started in 1949 and continued throughout the 1950s) between National Revolutionary Army and People's Liberation Army.

Exhibition
On the outside of museum, three bronze statues of soldiers ready for battle are displayed. On both sides are tanks used during the battle. Inside of the museum are the exhibition of military equipment, military weapons, battle-related documents, photos and paintings.

See also
 List of museums in Taiwan

References

External links

 Kinmen's Guningtou area attractions commemorate important battle
中華民國博物館學會 - 古寧頭戰史館

1984 establishments in Taiwan
Jinning Township
Military and war museums in Taiwan
Military of the Republic of China
Museums in Kinmen County